Jannaschia faecimaris is a Gram-negative and non-motile bacterium from the genus of Jannaschia which has been isolated from tidal flat sediments from Yellow Sea from Hwang-do in Korea.

References

 Rhodobacteraceae
Bacteria described in 2014